Florence Ada Keynes (née Brown; 10 March 1861 – 13 February 1958) was an English author, historian and politician.

Career

Keynes was an early graduate of Newnham College, Cambridge where her contemporaries included the economist Mary Marshall. She subsequently became involved in local charitable work, establishing an early juvenile labour exchange, and was one of the founders of the Papworth Village Settlement for sufferers of tuberculosis, a forerunner of Papworth Hospital. She was secretary of the local Charity Organisation Society, which provided pensions for the elderly living in poverty, and worked with inmates of workhouses to resettle them into society. She encouraged women students to enter charitable work, including Eglantyne Jebb who was introduced to her by Marshall; Jebb subsequently founded Save the Children.

Cambridge Borough Council
She was the first female councillor of Cambridge City Council in August 1914, and was also a town magistrate. At 70 years of age, Keynes became Mayor of Cambridge on 9 November 1932, the second woman to hold the office. She chaired the committee responsible for the building of the new Guildhall, which was completed in 1939.

Works
Retiring from public duties in 1939, she wrote a history of Cambridge, By-Ways of Cambridge History (Cambridge University Press, 1947). In 1950 she published a memoir, Gathering up the threads (W Heffer & Son Ltd, 1950), in which she discusses her ancestors along with the childhoods of her children John Maynard, Margaret and Geoffrey.

Family
Keynes was the daughter of Rev. John Brown of Bunyan's Chapel, Bedford, and schoolteacher Ada Haydon, née Ford (1837–1929). Her brother Sir Walter Langdon-Brown was the Regius Professor of Physic (medicine) at the University of Cambridge.

She married the economist John Neville Keynes in 1882. They had a daughter and two sons:

 John Maynard Keynes (1883–1946), the economist and public servant
 Margaret Neville Hill (1885–1970), who in 1913 married Archibald Hill, winner of the 1922 Nobel Prize in Physiology
Geoffrey Langdon Keynes (1887–1982), a surgeon

See also
Keynes family
Papworth Hospital

References

1861 births
1958 deaths
20th-century British writers
Alumni of Newnham College, Cambridge
British women historians
Councillors in Cambridgeshire
Florence
Mayors of Cambridge
British social reformers
Women mayors of places in England
Presidents of the National Council of Women of Great Britain
20th-century English women
20th-century English people
Women councillors in England